"Roy's Keen" is a song by Morrissey, released as a single in October 1997. It was the second single to be taken from the Maladjusted album and was the third solo Morrissey single not to feature himself in the cover picture, instead using a photograph of two boys taken by Roger Mayne on London's Southam Street in the 1950s.

The single reached number 42 on the UK Singles Chart. Its failure to reach the top 40 meant a performance of the song recorded for Top of the Pops did not air until it was shown on Top of the Pops 2 in 2003.

The title refrain is a pun on the name of former Manchester United footballer Roy Keane – as Morrissey acknowledged during live performances of the song by changing words to "never seen a keener midfielder". The song was played over the closing credits of Keane's 2002 documentary As I See It.

Despite being released as a single, the song was omitted from Maladjusted's remastered CD reissue in 2009.

Track listings

7" vinyl and cassette
 "Roy's Keen"
 "Lost"

12" vinyl and CD (UK)
 "Roy's Keen"
 "Lost"
 "The Edges Are No Longer Parallel"

Musicians
 Morrissey: vocals
 Martin Boorer: guitar
 Alain Whyte: guitar
 Jonny Bridgwood: bass
 Spencer James Cobrin: drums

Reception
In his review for AllMusic Ned Raggett described the title track as "one of Morrissey's most curious songs; the music is okay enough, though his band can and have done better, but the lyric is about a window cleaner, of all things."  Raggett preferred the B-sides, especially The Edges Are No Longer Parallel, "one of his all-time best songs."

References

Morrissey songs
Songs written by Morrissey
Songs written by Alain Whyte
1997 singles
Song recordings produced by Steve Lillywhite